Huntley is an unincorporated community in Faribault County, Minnesota, United States. Huntley has a post office with ZIP code 56047.

History
Huntley was laid out in 1879, and named for Henry M. Huntington, an early settler. A post office was established at Huntley in 1879.

References

Unincorporated communities in Faribault County, Minnesota
Unincorporated communities in Minnesota